The Tondar-69 is a short-range ballistic missile (SRBM) originating in China and operated by the armed forces of Iran.  It was originally deployed by the Iranian army in 1992. The design is based on the Chinese CSS-8, which itself was designed from the Soviet S-75 surface-to-air missile (SAM).

It is launched from static transporter erector launchers towed into position. Up to two hundred CSS-8 missiles were acquired from 1989-1992 and modified to Tondar-69 specifications.

References

External sources
 CSIS Missile Threat - Tondar-69

Surface-to-surface missiles of Iran
Short-range ballistic missiles of Iran
Theatre ballistic missiles
Military equipment introduced in the 1990s